is an athletic stadium in Gifu Memorial Center, Gifu, Gifu, Japan.

It was one of the home stadium of football club FC Gifu from 2010 to 2012.

References

Sports venues in Gifu Prefecture
Football venues in Japan
Buildings and structures in Gifu
FC Gifu